Sue Gibson (8 November 1952 – 27 July 2016) was a British cinematographer known for the film Mrs. Dalloway (1997). She was the first female member of the British Society of Cinematographers, and later became the first female president of the society in 2008.

Early life and biography
Sue Gibson was born in Derbyshire, England.  She left Derbyshire at the age of 18, in 1970 after school and followed her passion, taking up photography at the Newport College of Art.

Gibson’s experience with photography started after she was given her first camera at the age of fourteen. Her studies at Newport College of Art influenced her interest in film, thus leading her to attend the National Film and Television School, graduating in 1981.

Career
After graduating in 1981 from the National Film and Television School, Gibson started her career in the film industry as a clapper loader. She worked as a clapper loader for only two years until she started her position as Director of Photography for commercials, television shows, and films.

Gibson progressed from working on television commercials to television productions after 10 years: her first being Hear My Song (1991), which then started her work with major films and television series. As Gibson was one of the rare females working in photography and behind the camera in her day, she built her experience based on the help and teachings of those on set around her. When her first production came around, her feelings on working on Hear My Song (1991) were stated as: “It was fantastic and a great film to work on. Being your first feature you put your heart and soul into it” Sue Gibson, quoted from In Conversation with Cinematographers, by David A. Ellis.

Gibson went on to work on various television productions and series, and major film productions, including Mrs. Dalloway (1997), Resident Evil (2002), Alien vs. Predator (film) (2004), and more. She also worked on the British television series Agatha Raisin: The Quiche of Death (2014). The last thing she worked on before her death was 4 episodes of 'Death In Paradise' and was posthumously awarded The Philips Vari-Lite Award for Drama at The Knight of Illumination Awards 2016 for 2 of the episodes.

Legacy
Sue Gibson has the legacy of holding the first female member of the British Society of Cinematographers, invited to the group in 1992. Her awards and work landed her an offer to be elected as a member on the board of governors for the society in 2004, and later to become the first female president of the British Society of Cinematographers between the years of 2008-2010.

Her legacy as the first female member of the British Society of Cinematographers allowed co-worker, director Marleen Gorris, to speak highly of Gibson in an interview on the film Mrs. Dalloway, claiming she was: "the most important and only woman".

Filmography
Taken from Sue Gibson on the Internet Movie Database:

Awards and nominations
 In 1988, Sue Gibson won the award Lion D'Or at the Cannes Film Festival for a "K shoes" commercial
 In 1993, Sue Gibson won the Evening Standard Award for Best Technical/Artistic Achievement on Hear My Song (1991) and Secret Friends(1991).
 In 1995, she was awarded for her contribution to the medium
 In 1999, The Irish Film and Television Award for best craft contributing in television for Amongst Women (1998).
 In 2010, Gibson was given an award for her cinematography by the International Women’s Foundation.

References

External links
 Sue Gibson at the Internet Movie Database

1952 births
2016 deaths
People from Derbyshire
English women cinematographers